Aonyx is a genus of otters, containing three species, the African clawless otter, the Congo clawless otter, and the Asian small-clawed otter. 
The word aonyx means "clawless", derived from the prefix a- ("without") and onyx ("claw/hoof").

Species
Three species are currently recognised:

Zoologists differ as to whether or not to include the Asian small-clawed otter in this genus, or in its own genus Amblonyx. They also differ as to whether the Congo clawless otter is a species, or is conspecific with the African clawless otter.

Notes

References

External links
 
 

Mammal genera
Otters
Taxa named by René Lesson